CFR Title 7 – Agriculture is one of 50 titles comprising the United States Code of Federal Regulations (CFR) and contains the principal set of rules and regulations issued by federal agencies regarding agriculture. It is available in digital and printed form and can be referenced online using the Electronic Code of Federal Regulations (e-CFR).

Structure 

The table of contents, as reflected in the e-CFR updated May 2, 2022, is as follows:

 07
Agriculture in the United States